"Ithica 27 ϕ 9" is a song by Scottish post-rock band Mogwai.

"Ithica 27 ϕ 9" was originally released as a double A-side single with "Summer" on 4 November 1996 through Love Train. It was later included on the 1997 compilation album, Ten Rapid (Collected Recordings 1996-1997).

The song is also as referred to as "Ithica 27ø9", "Ithica 27-9" and "Ithica 27 Phi 9".

Musical composition
The guitars in the song are tuned to (C♯ A E G♯ G♯ G♯).
The song begins with a repeated note played by guitar, until (0:13), when a soft riff based on the G♯ minor chord is played. At (0:38), more guitars and a drumbeat enter, and an alternate melody is played. At (1:01), the main melody is played again then at (1:25), the drumbeat and guitars get steadily heavier and faster, until at (1:47), a wall of distorted guitar noise explodes. This continues to (2:19), when the main riff is again played, until (2:40), when the guitar fades into silence.

Release and reception 
The song was first released as a 7" single, limited to 1500 copies through Love Train on November 4, 1996. The artwork featured on the sleeve of the 7" is by Neale Smith.

Personnel and credits 

Mogwai
 Dominic Aitchison – bass guitar
 Stuart Braithwaite – guitar
 Martin Bulloch – drum kit
 John Cummings – guitar

Production
 Paul Savage – production, mixing
 Neale Smith – artwork

References

External links
 "Ithica 27 ϕ 9" Guitar Tablature

Mogwai songs
1997 songs
Rock instrumentals
Songs written by Stuart Braithwaite
Songs written by Dominic Aitchison